The Cape Floral Region is a floristic region located near the southern tip of South Africa. It is the only floristic region of the Cape Floristic Kingdom, and includes only one floristic province, known as the Cape Floristic Province.

The Cape Floristic Region, the smallest of the six recognised floral kingdoms of the world, is an area of extraordinarily high diversity and endemism, and is home to over 9,000 vascular plant species, of which 69 percent are endemic. Much of this diversity is associated with the fynbos biome, a Mediterranean-type, fire-prone shrubland. The economical worth of fynbos biodiversity, based on harvests of fynbos products (e.g. wildflowers) and eco-tourism, is estimated to be in the region of R77 million (~US$5 million) a year. Thus, it is clear that the Cape Floristic Region has both economic and intrinsic biological value as a biodiversity hotspot.

Location and description 
Home to the greatest non-tropical concentration of higher plant species in the world, the region is the only hotspot that encompasses an entire floral kingdom, and holds five of South Africa's 12 endemic plant families and 160 endemic genera. Covering 78,555 km2, Cape Floristic Region hotspot is located entirely within the borders of South Africa. It is one of the five temperate Mediterranean-type systems on the hotspots list, and is one of only two hotspots that encompass an entire floral kingdom (the other being New Caledonia). The Region covers the Mediterranean climate region of South Africa in the Western Cape in the southwestern corner of the country, and extends eastward into the Eastern Cape, a transitional zone between the winter rainfall region to the west and the summer-rainfall region to the east in KwaZulu-Natal.

Flora 
Most of the region is covered with fynbos, a sclerophyllous shrubland occurring on acid sands or nutrient-poor soils derived from Table Mountain sandstones (Cape Supergroup). Fynbos is home to a diverse plethora of plant species including many members of the protea family (Proteaceae), heath family (Ericaceae), and reed family of restios (Restionaceae). Other vegetation types are sandveld, a soft coastal scrubland found mostly on the west-facing coast of the Western Cape Province, on tertiary sands. Renosterveld is a grassy shrubland dominated by members of the daisy family (Asteraceae), particularly renosterbos (Elytropappus rhinocerotis), graminoids and geophytes, occurring on the base-rich shaley soils of the coastal forelands. Small pockets of Afromontane forest (Southern Afrotemperate Forest) can be found in humid and sheltered areas.

According to Takhtajan (1978), the following families are endemic or subendemic to the region: Grubbiaceae, Roridulaceae, Bruniaceae, Penaeaceae, Greyiaceae, Geissolomataceae, Retziaceae (Retzia) and Stilbaceae.Rooibos is produced out of this region.

Vegetation types

List of vegetation types of the Cape Floristic Region:
 
 
 
 
 
 
 
 
 
 
 
 
 
 
 Swartland Alluvium Renosterveld
 Swartland Granite Renosterveld
 
 Swartland Silcrete Renosterveld

Ecology 
The World Wide Fund for Nature divides the Cape floristic region into three ecoregions: the Lowland fynbos and renosterveld, Montane fynbos and renosterveld and the Albany thickets.

The fynbos ecoregions are designated one of the Global 200 priority ecoregions for conservation. Conservation International declared the Cape floristic region to be a biodiversity hotspot.

It is thought that the Cape Floristic Region is experiencing one of the most rapid rates of extinction in the world due to habitat loss, land degradation, and invasive alien plants.

World Heritage Site 

In 2004, the "Cape Floral Region Protected Areas" were inscribed as a World Heritage Site. The site includes eight representative protected areas:
 Table Mountain National Park
 Cederberg Wilderness Area
 Groot Winterhoek Wilderness Area
 Boland Mountain Complex (Limietberg Nature Reserve, Jonkershoek Nature Reserve, Assegaaibosch Nature Reserve, Hottentots Holland Nature Reserve, Kogelberg Nature Reserve)
 De Hoop Nature Reserve
 Boosmansbos Wilderness Area
 Swartberg Complex (Swartberg Nature Reserve, Gamkapoort Nature Reserve, Towerkop Nature Reserve)
 Baviaanskloof Mega Reserve

References 
This article incorporates CC BY-3.0 text from the reference

External links 

 Conservation International: Cape floristic Region – biodiversity hotspot
 Cape Action: the Cape floristic Region

Floristic regions
Fynbos
 
 
Mediterranean forests, woodlands, and scrub
Afromontane ecoregions
Afrotropical realm
Geography of South Africa
World Heritage Sites in South Africa